Komsomolsky is a rural locality (a settlement) and the administrative center of Verkhneshonoshskoye Rural Settlement of Velsky District, Arkhangelsk Oblast, Russia. The population was 949 as of 2014. There are 14 streets.

Geography 
Komsomolsky is located 92 km northwest of Velsk (the district's administrative centre) by road. Tyomnaya is the nearest rural locality.

References 

Rural localities in Velsky District